The New Zealand Māori cricket team is a team that represented the Māori community of New Zealand in the 2001 Pacifica Cup cricket tournament. Whilst their rugby union and rugby league counterparts play often, this is the only appearance to date of the cricket team.

2001 Pacifica Cup

The New Zealand Māori team took part in the first Pacifica Cup. They topped their first round group, winning all three of their matches against the Cook Islands, Papua New Guinea and Samoa. They then beat Tonga in the semi-finals before beating Fiji in the final to win the tournament. They did not compete in the 2002 tournament.

Players

The following players played for the New Zealand Māori in the 2001 Pacifica Cup:

Robert Bird
Ben J. Cochrane
Leigh Kelly (captain) - previously played first-class cricket for Wellington
David Little - previously played first-class and List A cricket for Wellington
Peter McGlashan - has since played international Twenty20 cricket for New Zealand
Jonathan McNamee - previously played for New Zealand Under-19s
Thomas Nukunuku
Phillip T. Otto
Jonathan Paine
Jesse Ryder - has since played first-class and List A cricket for Central Districts and Wellington, Twenty20 cricket for Wellington, List A cricket as an overseas player for Ireland and is a middle order batsman in the Tests and opens the batting in One Day Internationals and Twenty20's for New Zealand
Tane Topia - played one List A match for Auckland
Ash Turner - has since played first-class and List A cricket for Wellington
Gene Waller

Other notable players of Māori heritage

Trent Boult
Shane Bond
Doug Bracewell
Kyle Mills
Daryl Tuffey
Craig McMillan
Heath Davis
Kieran Noema-Barnett
Adam Parore
Anaru Kitchen
Ben Wheeler
Tama Canning
Ben Stokes
Zak Gibson
Agnes Ell
Hilda Buck
Rona McKenzie
Suzie Bates
Sara McGlashan
Lea Tahuhu

See also
 New Zealand Māori rugby union team
 New Zealand Māori rugby league team

References

Cricket teams in New Zealand
Cricket